Karel Kuhn (born 14 September 1915, date of death unknown) was a Czech basketball player. He competed in the men's tournament at the 1936 Summer Olympics.

References

1915 births
Year of death missing
Czech men's basketball players
Olympic basketball players of Czechoslovakia
Basketball players at the 1936 Summer Olympics
Place of birth missing